Eduardo Usabiaga y Ocharán (1891–1973) was a Cuban diplomat.

Career 
After high school he moved to the United States, where he learned English and French and devoted himself to his business.
On June 17, 1925 he joined the Foreign Service.
From 1925 to 1928 he was Envoy Extraordinary and Minister Plenipotentiary of Cuba in Santiago de Chile.
From 1928 to 1930 he was Envoy Extraordinary and Minister Plenipotentiary in Prague with concurrent accreditation in Warsaw, Bucharest and Belgrade in the Kingdom of Serbs Croats and Slovenes.
In 1931 he was Under Secretary of State in the Ministry of Foreign Affairs (Cuba).
In 1932 he was Chief of Protocol in Havana.
 From 1933 to 1935 he was Envoy Extraordinary and Minister Plenipotentiary in Paris.

References 

1891 births
1973 deaths
Ambassadors of Cuba to Chile
Ambassadors of Cuba to Czechoslovakia
Ambassadors of Cuba to France
Ambassadors of Cuba to Poland
Ambassadors of Cuba to Yugoslavia
Ambassadors of Cuba to Romania
Cuban expatriates in the United States